This is a list of Turkish Navy mine warfare vessels that have served past and present, from 10 July 1920 to present.

Minelayers

Atak

Sivrihisar class 

Sivrihisar class

Danish Falster class 

Nusret class ( Falster class):

Ex-US LSM 1 class coastal minelayer 

Mordoğan class: (Ex- LSM-1 class Landing Ship Medium):

Minehunters

Engin class 
Engin class minehunter (Edincik class minehunter,  Circe class minehunter):

Aydın class 
Aydın-class minehunter (subclass of  Fr. Lürssen Werft GmbH & Co. KG Frankenthal-class minehunter):

Minesweeper

Kavak class 
Kavak class coastal minesweeper

Ex-US YMS type 
K class minesweeper (Ex-US YMS type inshore minesweeper):

Ex-US Cape class 
F class minesweeper (Foça class minesweeper,  Cape class inshore minesweeper):

Redwing class early type
S class minesweeper ( Redwing class early type coastal minesweeper):

Redwing class later type 
S class minesweeper ( Redwing class later type coastal minesweeper):

Adjutant class 
S class minesweeper ( Adjutant class minesweeper):

Ex-French Mercure class 
Karamürsel class minesweeper (Ex- Vegesack class minesweeper) -> K class patrol boat:

Ex-Canadian Bay class 
:   -> T class patrol boat:

Sources

External links 
 Serhat Guvenc, "Building a Republican Navy in Turkey: 1924-1939", International Journal of Naval History
 Mayın Filosu Komutanlığı
 Unofficial Homepage of Turkish Navy
 Motor Minesweeper (AMS), Minesweeper Coastal (MSC), Minesweeper Coastal (Old) (MSC O), Inshore Minesweeper (MSI) Index, NavSource.

Turkish Navy
Mine warfare vessels of the Turkish Navy
Mine warfare vessels
Lists of ships of Turkey